Burnupia stenochorias is a species of small freshwater snail or limpet, an aquatic gastropod mollusk in the family Planorbidae, the ram's horn snails and their allies.

Distribution 
This freshwater limpet is found in South Africa.

Ecology 
Burnupia stenochorias (like all the other species in the genus Burnupia) lives in well-oxygenated freshwater habitats. Burnupia stenochorias is considered to be an ecotoxicological indicator of water quality, but it is not effectively used yet.

References

Planorbidae
Fauna of South Africa
Gastropods described in 1903